

The Bellanca 77-140 Bomber was a bomber aircraft built in small numbers in the United States in the 1930s. It was a derivative of Bellanca's successful Aircruiser civil transport in which the Aircruiser's single, nose-mounted engine was replaced by twin engines on the upper wing. The United States military were not interested in the type, but the Colombian Air Force bought a small number, including a float-equipped version dubbed the 77-320 Junior. This version also differed from the landplane in having a fully enclosed nose turret in place of the open turret of the 77-140.

Specifications (77-140)

Users

Colombian Air Force

See also

References

 
 aerofiles.com
 Fuerza Aérea Colombiana

77-140
1930s United States bomber aircraft
High-wing aircraft
Aircraft first flown in 1934
Twin piston-engined tractor aircraft

 Flugzeug Fibel